Robert Peirson (2 June 1821 – 15 June 1891) was an English astronomer and theoretical physicist.

Born into a wealthy family at their residence at No. 5, Barnsbury Park, Islington, Middlesex, Robert Peirson lived his life there except during his residence at Cambridge.

After leaving Cambridge he lived a reclusive life and occupied himself with the study of astronomy and optics. In 1858 he purchased several acres of land in Wimbledon Park, Surrey, and arranged the construction there during 1859 to 1861 of a stately residence, which he named Devonshire Lodge. However, he suffered a severe financial reverse shortly before he could move there. Consequently, he had to sell Devonshire Lodge and remain at his Barnsbury residence.

He never married. His posthumous papers were examined by Alfred William Flux, Fellow of St John's College, Cambridge, with a view to the publication of some portion of them. In 1893, St. John's College Library acquired the manuscript papers and a few notebooks. The material is contained in 50 boxes, and the majority relates to astronomy and optics, dating from 1854 to 1890.

References

1821 births
1891 deaths
Alumni of St John's College, Cambridge
19th-century British astronomers
People from the London Borough of Islington